Marazzi is a surname. Notable people with the surname include:

 David Marazzi (born 1984), Swiss football player
 Nicolas Marazzi (born 1981), Swiss football player
 Paul Marazzi (singer) (born 1975), British musician
 Christian Marazzi (born 1951), Swiss socio-economist

See also
 Pietra Marazzi, commune in Italy
 Carrozzeria Marazzi, Italian coach building company
 Marazzi design, manufacturing and distribution of ceramic tiles, Italy